Get Up is an American sports talk morning television program hosted by Mike Greenberg that airs weekdays on ESPN. Michelle Beadle was one of the original hosts with Greenberg and Jalen Rose, but decided to leave the program in September 2018 to devote more time to ESPN's NBA coverage. It premiered on April 2, 2018. The program features news, opinion and analysis from the hosts and guests. It airs live weekdays from 8 am–10 am ET with reruns from 10 am–12 pm ET on ESPN2, and from 12 pm–2 pm ET on ESPNews, and also airs on Sirius XM live. Dan Graziano regularly fills in for Greenberg as host.

Prior to Get Up, Greenberg co-hosted the Mike & Mike radio show with Mike Golic but left in November 2017 after an 18-year run together. Golic's contract with ESPN expired at the end of 2020.

The show is broadcast from a newly built studio in Pier 17 at New York's South Street Seaport. The premiere was originally set for New Year's Day 2018, but construction delays at the new studio pushed it back to April 2.

The ratings for the show's live debut netted 283,000 viewers and dropped to 233,000 the next day.

Hosts

Current
 Mike Greenberg (2018–present)

Former
 Laura Rutledge (2019–2020)
 Jalen Rose (2018–2019)
 Michelle Beadle (2018)

References

External links

2018 American television series debuts
ESPN original programming
American sports radio programs
American sports television series
Sirius XM Radio programs
2020s American television series